The 2009–10 St. Francis Xavier X-Women women's ice hockey team represented St. Francis Xavier University. Their overall record of 18-6-0 (four losses were overtime losses) ranked second overall in the AUS. The X-Women qualified for the CIS National Championship tournament.

Exhibition

Season standings

Postseason

AUS playoffs

Heading into the CIS tournament, the X-Women were 3-21 in eight previous tournament appearances. The X-Women played for a medal once, in 2006, when they lost 3-2 to the McGill Martlets in the third-place game.

Player stats
Fenerty finished second in scoring among all defenders in the AUS with 16 points. Her 16 points (accomplished in 24 games) were a career high for Fenerty. Hay accumulated 14 points (5 goals and 9 assists).

Skaters

Goaltenders

Awards and honors
Suzanne Fenerty, 2010 AUS First Team All-Star
Marilyn Hay, 2010 AUS First Team All-Star (Hay was a first team selection for the fourth consecutive season.)

References

See also
 Canadian Interuniversity Sport

St. Francis Xavier
St